The 2001 Northern Illinois Huskies football team represented Northern Illinois University as a member of the West Division of the Mid-American Conference (MAC) during the 2001 NCAA Division I-A football season. Led by sixth-year head coach Joe Novak, the Huskies compiled an overall record of 6–5 with a mark of 4–3 in conference play, sharing the MAC's West Division title with Ball State and Toledo. Northern Illinois played home games at Huskie Stadium in DeKalb, Illinois.

Schedule

References

Northern Illinois
Northern Illinois Huskies football seasons
Northern Illinois Huskies football